Kulada Charan Das Gupta ( 3 January 1900 – 14 February 1987) was the Chief Justice of Calcutta High Court and Judge of the Supreme Court of India.

Early life
Kulada Charan Das Gupta was born in a Bengali middle class family of Kalia village (presently in Bangladesh) in British India. His father Annada Charan was a government servant. He studied from Hindu School and passed B. A. from the Presidency College, Kolkata in 1920 with first class in Economics. Then he went to Magdalene College under Cambridge University and received Economics Tripos in 1923.

Career
After passing the Indian Civil Service in 1925 he chose  judicial service and joined as Assistant Magistrate and collector in Bengal under British Government. He was promoted as District and Session Judge in 1934 but took leave for higher study in Law. In 1938 Das Gupta returned to England and was called to the Bar from Gray's Inn. He became the judge of Calcutta High Court since 1948 and elevated to the post Chief Justice in 1958. After retirement of Justice Phani Bhusan Chakravartti he took over the charge of Chief Justice 1958 to 1959. In October, 1958 Das Gupta became the Chairman, Commission to enquire into Monopolies and Concentration of Wealth. He was also promoted as a Justice of the Supreme Court of India on 24 August 1959 after retirement of Hon'ble Justice N.H. Bhagwati. Apart from law Das Gupta was a scholar of Economics and Sanskrit Literature.

References

1900 births
1987 deaths
British India judges
Judges of the Calcutta High Court
20th-century Indian judges
Chief Justices of the Calcutta High Court
Members of Gray's Inn
Alumni of Magdalene College, Cambridge
Justices of the Supreme Court of India
University of Calcutta alumni
Scholars from Kolkata
Indian barristers
Indian civil servants
Indian Civil Service (British India) officers